Dark Conspiracy is a near-future horror role-playing game (RPG) originally written by Lester W. Smith and published by Game Designers' Workshop (GDW) in 1991. Several newer editions have been published.

Setting 
Dark Conspiracy is set in the United States of the early 21st century after a "Greater Depression" has destroyed the global economy and left many countries isolated and bankrupt. Many American cities have expanded to form massive metroplexes, in some cases covering entire states.  Outside of the metroplexes the majority of the country has become known as "Out-Law" where there is virtually no federal or state protection and the road network joining metroplexes is poorly maintained.  Scattered throughout the Out-Law and even in the darker and more forbidding areas of the Metroplexes, zones known as "Demonground" are spawning mysterious "dark minions": monsters armed with deadly weapons. Players typically assume the roles of "Minion Hunters", people who have stumbled across this "Dark Incursion" and have taken up arms against it.

Publication history

First edition
Game designer Lester Smith created Dark Conspiracy, a near-future game of dark horror, which was subsequently published as a 366-page softcover book by GDW using a rules system derived from Twilight: 2000. Seventeen artists contributed artwork, including Larry Elmore (cover art), Earl Geier, Tim Bradstreet, Janet Aulisio and Elizabeth Danforth.

The following year, a trilogy of Dark Conspiracy novels by Michael Stackpole was published. The first edition also had numerous expansion volumes such as Empathic Sourcebook, Dark Races I, Protodimensions, PC Booster Kit, and Darktek; as well as several adventure modules, and a boardgame. 

The first edition was also well-supported in GDW's own gaming magazine Challenge, and occasionally in several other gaming publications such as Dragon and White Wolf. The UK magazine Role Player Independent also carried several articles about the first edition game.

The first edition uses the same skill-based rule system as Twilight 2000, using a d10 based system for determining success at skill use. Character creation is achieved through a multi-step process in which the player selects various career terms for their character.  Each career term specifies either a pre-determined set of skills that the character gained, or allows a certain number of points to be distributed among a set skill list.  Each skill is governed by an attribute, either randomly rolled or set using a point distribution method.  Each career term also grants the character a fixed number of contacts.  As a limit to the number of terms a character can take, each term ages the character four years.  Once a certain age limit is reached, the player has to make rolls to prevent the loss of physically oriented attributes due to aging.

The rules also include an expansive illustrated list of equipment for use in the characters' fight, and pictures of many of the items, weapons and vehicles mentioned. Game designer Lester Smith explained, "Some people want lots; others want little... [P]eople that don’t want them can ignore them, but people who do want them will be glad they’re there. It doesn’t work the other way ‘round... As a role-player myself, I want to be able to see what something looks like, if my character is going to be carrying it. I hate picking something for its stats and having no idea of what it looks like."

Second edition
The Dark Conspiracy product line was discontinued in 1993 due to the declining customer interest. When GDW went out of business in 1995, Dark Conspiracy Enterprises picked up the rights to Dark Conspiracy and later licensed a second edition to Dynasty Presentations. This was published in 1997 as two folio-sized volumes, a book for players, and a book for gamemasters. Both books were published as shorter "Basic" editions and long "Master" editions.

Third edition 
Dark Conspiracy Enterprises licensed The Gamers' Conglomerate to publish a third edition, but this did not happen. In 2010, the option for a third edition was granted to Kinstaff Media. Kinstaff created a division called 3 Hombres Games, which published the PDF of a third edition in 2012 that uses a new rules system with revised character generation and combat rules. 

A supplement titled Conspiracy Rules and other material were under development when 3 Hombres Games went out of business.

Products

1st Edition
 Dark Conspiracy Core Rulebook

Game Tools
 PC Booster Kit

Sourcebooks and Scenarios
 Among the Dead (Scenario)
 Dark Races #1 Compendium (Sourcebook)
 DarkTek (Sourebook)
 Empathic Sourcebook (Sourcebook)
 Heart of Darkness (Scenario)
 Hellsgate (Scenario)
 Ice Daemon (Scenario)
 New Orleans (Scenario)
 Nightsider (Scenario)
 Proto-Dimensions Sourcebook #1 (Sourcebook)

Board game
 Minion Hunter (Core Game)
 Minion Nation (Expansion Set)

Novels
Michael A. Stackpole wrote three novels, the Fiddleback trilogy, set in the Dark Conspiracy universe that were published by GDW and released alongside the first edition of the game.

 A Gathering Evil
 Evil Ascending
 Evil Triumphant

2nd Edition
 Player's Handbook (Basic Edition)
 Player's Handbook (Master Edition)
 Referee's Guide (Basic Edition)
 Referee's Guide (Master Edition)

Game Tools
 Referee's Screen & Adventures (contained the adventures Ice Daemon and Nightsider converted to 2nd Edition rules).

Scenarios and Sourcebooks
 The Shadow Falls (Sin City, Vol 1)
 Of Gates and Gods (Sin City, Vol 2)
 Masks of Darkness (Sin City, Vol 3)

Third edition
 Conspiracy Rules - The main rulebook for Dark Conspiracy III. Currently in version 1.1 with any outstanding errata corrected.
 Empathic Guide - A free rules expansion detailing psionics rules and sanity. Largely derived from the original Empathic Sourcebook with new material by Lee Williams and Norm Fenlason, who also provided the interior illustrations.
 Conspiracy Rules Character Sheet - The official and expanded PDF form-fillable and auto-calculating version of the Conspiracy Rules character sheets. Designed by Norm Fenlason who also provided the cover design.
 Detour - A short adventure by Captain Obvious, art by David Lee Ingersoll.
 Acute Care - A short adventure written by Dave Schuey, art by David Lee Ingersoll.
 This Just In - A short adventure written and illustrated by Norm Fenlason. Originally conceived as the intro adventure for The Gamers Conglomerate's cancelled edition.
 Tampete - A fan-made city Sourcebook published in 2017.

Clockwork Publishing Proposed Material
 Core Rulebook
 Referee Screen with introductory scenario
 Equipment sourcebook
 Monsters sourcebook
 Scenario collection
 Empathic powers sourcebook

Reception
In the November 1991 edition of Dragon (Issue 175), Allen Varney liked the thoroughness of the rules, but thought the horror aspect of the game was unfocussed, dealing as it did with everything from campy 1950s space monsters to the brooding horror of Lovecraftian aliens. "I might legitimately question... how well the rules aid the various kinds of horror." However, Varney concluded that the game had much to offer experienced gamemasters who knew what "flavour" of horror game they wanted to create: "The Dark Conspiracy game targets experienced referees who already know the kinds of horror adventures they want to run. Its long and very complete rules offer much value to players who want a fair shot (or multiple autofire shots) against the monsters. This game is a giant step forward for GDW in size, presentation, and imagination.""

In a 1996 reader poll by Arcane magazine of readers to determine the 50 most popular roleplaying games of all time, Dark Conspiracy was ranked 43rd. Editor Paul Pettengale commented: "Players take on the roles of people who have learnt of the evil forces at work in the world, and are struggling to defeat them. The evil forces have infiltrated what remains of the government and powerful corporations. A great blend of cyberpunk, Call of Cthulhu and conspiracy paranoia."

Reviews
White Wolf #29 (Oct./Nov., 1991)
Shadis #52 (Oct., 1998)

References

External links
Dark Conspiracy fan website and forum
Demonground Magazine website
Protodimension Magazine archive
Far Future Enterprises website
Dark Conspiracy at Clockwork Publishing

Science fiction role-playing games
Horror role-playing games
Game Designers' Workshop games
Role-playing games introduced in 1991
Campaign settings
Role-playing games about conspiracy theories